The 1923–24 international cricket season was from September 1923 to April 1924. The season consists with one minor international tour.

Season overview

February

New South Wales in New Zealand

References

International cricket competitions by season
1923 in cricket
1924 in cricket